Giovanni Marco Suarez (born 20 February 1963) is an Italian rower. He competed at the 1984 Summer Olympics, 1988 Summer Olympics and the 1992 Summer Olympics.

References

1963 births
Living people
Italian male rowers
Olympic rowers of Italy
Rowers at the 1984 Summer Olympics
Rowers at the 1988 Summer Olympics
Rowers at the 1992 Summer Olympics
Rowers from Greater London